Syarifah Olvah Bwefar Alhamid (born March 24, 1990) or beter known as S. Olvah Alhamid is an Indonesian model from Kaimana Regency and became the first Papuan women who won the title of Puteri Indonesia Perdamaian, precisely at the beauty pageant of Puteri Indonesia 2015. For her victory in the Top 5 Puteri Indonesia 2015, Olvah then appointed by the Puteri Indonesia Foundation to represent Indonesia in the Miss Eco Universe 2016 beauty pageant held in Egypt. At the pageant, he managed to occupy the Top 16 position and also won best national costume with costume named 'Bird of Paradise'.

Biography

Early life
Olvah was born in Kaimana Regency to a father of Arab Hadhrami descendant of Ba 'Alawi sada clan named Salim Alhamid and Papuan mother named Aki Maryam Bwefar. Olvah is the third child of 5 siblings, her four siblings are S. Mardiah Alhamid, S. Nurnissa Alhamid, Khalid Alhamid, and Luth Alhamid.

Education
Olvah is a graduate of 5 State Senior High School of Surabaya in 2007. Furthermore, she continued her study to the University of Indonesia majoring in Development Economics. In 2010, she entered the University of Indonesia International Class Program at University of Groningen majoring in International Business and Management. In 2013 she graduated with a thesis entitled 'Customer Involvement Increases Customer Satisfaction' and received a double degree from University of Indonesia (Bachelor of Economics, Indonesian: Sarjana Ekonomi or abbreviated as S.E.) and University of Groningen (Bachelor of Science).

Beauty pageant

Puteri Indonesia 2015
Olvah represent her province Papua at Puteri Indonesia 2015, where she finished at the "Top-5" finalist, the highest than any other Papuan representative at the pageant.

Miss Eco Universe 2016
Olvah represent Indonesia in the Miss Eco Universe 2016 held in Hurghada – Egypt, she became the first Indonesian to compete for the title of Miss Eco Universe pageant. She finally finished on the "Top 16" and won "Best National Costume" with her costume named "Bird of Paradise", that was made from 100% eco-friendly material, the costume itself was inspired from the diversity of birds in Papua.

See also

 Puteri Indonesia 2015
 Miss Eco International 2016
 Anindya Kusuma Putri
 Chintya Fabyola
 Gresya Amanda Maaliwuga

References

Footnotes

Works cited

Bibliography

External links
 
 

1990 births
Indonesian beauty pageant winners
Indonesian female models
Puteri Indonesia contestants
Puteri Indonesia winners
Indonesian people of Yemeni descent
Living people
People from West Papua (province)
Papuan people